The Rîbnița District is an administrative district of Transnistria (de facto) in Moldova (de jure). Its seat is the city of Rîbnița, sometimes spelt as "Râbnița". The district contains this city and 22 other communes (with a total of 47 localities, including small villages and hamlets):

Rîbnița is located along the river Dniester, in the northern half of Transnistria. According to the 2004 Census in Transnistria, the population of the district is 82,699 people, including 24,729 (29.90%) Moldovans, 37,554 (45.41%) Ukrainians, 14,237 (17.22%) Russians, 149 (0.18%) Gagauzians, 309 (0.37%) Bulgarians, 51 (0.06%) Roma, 177 (0.64%) Jews, 528 (0.64%) Poles, 412 (0.50%) Belarusians, 150 (0.18%) Germans, 81 (0.10%) Armenians, and 4,322 (5.23%) others and non-declared.

List of heads of the state administration of the Rîbnița District and the town of Rîbnița 
 Tamara Kharitonovna Kilivnik (3 February 2012 - August 2012)
 Tatiana Mikhailovna Turanskaya (30 August 2012 – 10 July 2013)
 Alla Fedorovna Demyanova (18 September 2013 – )

References

External links 
 Rîbnița travel info
 State Administration of Rîbnița District and Rîbnița City
 Official site of People's Deputies of Rîbnița

 
Districts of Transnistria